Matthew Griffin (born 26 July 1983) is an Australian professional golfer. He plays on the PGA Tour of Australasia where he has won three times and the OneAsia Tour where he has won twice and won the Order of Merit in 2013. On 14 July 2014, Griffin won the Yamaha Hankyung KPGA Championship on the Korean Tour.

Professional wins (7)

PGA Tour of Australasia wins (3)

PGA Tour of Australasia playoff record (2–0)

OneAsia Tour wins (3)

*Note: The 2013 SK Telecom Open was shortened to 54 holes due to fog.
1Co-sanctioned by the Korean Tour

Korean Tour wins (3)

*Note: The 2013 SK Telecom Open was shortened to 54 holes due to fog.
1Co-sanctioned by the OneAsia Tour

Other wins (1)
2009 Fiji Open

Results in major championships

CUT = missed the half-way cut

NT = No tournament due to the COVID-19 pandemic
Note: Griffin only played in The Open Championship.

Results in World Golf Championships

Team appearances
Amateur
Eisenhower Trophy (representing Australia): 2008
Sloan Morpeth Trophy (representing Australia): 2008 (winners)
Australian Men's Interstate Teams Matches (representing Victoria): 2006, 2007, 2008 (winners)

References

External links

Australian male golfers
PGA Tour of Australasia golfers
Japan Golf Tour golfers
Monash University alumni
1983 births
Living people